Allohelea is a genus of predaceous midges in the family Ceratopogonidae. There are more than 30 described species in Allohelea.

Species
These 39 species belong to the genus Allohelea:

 Allohelea afra Clastrier & Delecolle, 1990
 Allohelea ampligonata Ratanaworabhan & Wirth
 Allohelea annulata Yu & Yan, 2004
 Allohelea arboricola Clastrier & Delecolle, 1990
 Allohelea arcuata Ratanaworabhan & Wirth
 Allohelea basiflava (Tokunaga, 1963)
 Allohelea basilobata Ratanaworabhan & Wirth
 Allohelea bottimeri Wirth, 1991
 Allohelea brinchangensis Ratanaworabhan & Wirth
 Allohelea camptostyla Ratanaworabhan & Wirth
 Allohelea capitata Ratanaworabhan & Wirth
 Allohelea chelagonata Ratanaworabhan & Wirth
 Allohelea digitata Ratanaworabhan & Wirth
 Allohelea distortifemur Wirth, 1991
 Allohelea fruticosa Yan & Yu, 1996
 Allohelea guineensis Clastrier & Delecolle, 1990
 Allohelea harpagonifera (Debenham, 1972)
 Allohelea inflativena Tokunaga
 Allohelea insularis (Tokunaga, 1941)
 Allohelea jianfengensis Liu & Yu, 1996
 Allohelea johannseni Wirth, 1953
 Allohelea kindiae Clastrier & Delecolle, 1990
 Allohelea limosa Clastrier & Delecolle, 1990
 Allohelea minxia Yu & Yan, 2004
 Allohelea multilineata (Lutz, 1914)
 Allohelea nebulosa Coquillett
 Allohelea neotropica Wirth, 1991
 Allohelea nigripes Ratanaworabhan & Wirth
 Allohelea parafurcata Ratanaworabhan & Wirth
 Allohelea paucimaculata Clastrier & Delecolle, 1990
 Allohelea pedicellata Wirth, 1991
 Allohelea qingdaoensis Ren & Yu, 1999
 Allohelea solidipedalis (Tokunaga, 1963)
 Allohelea superlobata Ratanaworabhan & Wirth
 Allohelea tessellata (J.W.Zetterstedt, 1850)
 Allohelea tricuspis (Debenham, 1972)
 Allohelea vespertillo Szadziewski, Gwizdalska-Kentzer & Gilka, 2011
 Allohelea weemsi Wirth, 1991
 Allohelea yorkensis (Debenham, 1972)

References

Further reading

 
 
 

Ceratopogonidae
Chironomoidea genera
Articles created by Qbugbot